Jagannath Singh may refer to:

 Jagannath Singh (politician) (1946-2015)
 Jagannath Singh (revolutionary) (1744-1790)
 Jagannath Singh College, Udharbond